Mia Čičak, known professionally as Miach, is a Croatian singer and songwriter. She is most known for her collaboration with Hiljson Mandela on the song "NLO". In September 2022, Miach released her debut EP Između nas through Aquarius Records.

Early life
Mia Čičak was born and raised in Zagreb, Croatia. During elementary school she started training taekwondo in which she earned a black belt over the years.

She completed her undergraduate university study in International Relations and is currently finishing her graduate studies in Business Economics and Globalization at the Libertas Business College in Zagreb.

Career
In February 2021, she started her own YouTube channel, entitled Mia Čičak, posting acoustic covers. In 2021 Čičak teamed up with Croatian songwriters and producers Vlaho Arbulić and Mihovil Šoštaršić and started working on her first songs in their Republika recording studio. Their first project was her debut single "23 32" which was released independently in late 2021. In early 2022, she signed a record deal with Aquarius Records and shortly after released her second single "Budi tu". "Trnci", her third single, was released in July 2022. Continuing her collaboration with songwriter and producer Mihovil Šoštarić, Čičak began working on her debut EP in 2022. Čičak's debut EP titled Između nas was released on 19 September 2022. The EP's lead single "NLO" is a collaboration with Croatian rapper Hiljson Mandela. Debuting at number 28 "NLO" became Čičak's first single to chart on the HR Top 40 chart. On 30 September 2022, Čičak held her first concert as a part of the Lil Drito Festival schedule at the Tvornica kulture in Zagreb. On 5 December 2022, she released the Između nas (Live Session) EP which includes live and acounstic versions of songs from her debut EP Između nas.

At the 2023 edition of the Cesarica Awards, Čičak was nominated in the category the Song of The Year with her song "NLO" but lost the award to Eni Jurišić's "Trebaš li me". On 8 February 2023, Čičak received a nomination for the 30th Annual Porin Awards in the category Best New Artist. The song "SMS" was released in March 2023 as a single from her yet-untitled debut studio album.

Artistry

Influences
Čičak cites Snoh Aalegra, Jhené Aiko, Drake, Nicki Minaj and Summer Walker as her musical influences.

Musical style and songwriting
Čičak describes her first self-written songs as a mixture of modern R&B and pop sounds. She uses her life experiences as an inspiration in her work but stated that some lyrics are totally a product of her imagination and not autobiographical. In an interview with Glazba.hr she noted how writting a song comes easy to her as she "wrote poems as a child and at one point even a book".

Discography

Extended plays

Singles

Awards and nominations

References

Croatian pop singers
Musicians from Zagreb
21st-century Croatian women singers
Living people

Year of birth missing (living people)